VIASA may refer to:

 Venezolana Internacional de Aviación Sociedad Anónima, a defunct Venezuelan airline
 Vehículos Industriales y Agrícolas, S.A, a defunct Spanish automaker